Xiyuan station may refer to:

 Xiyuan station (Beijing Subway), a station on Line 4 and Line 16 of the Beijing Subway.
 , a station on Line 3 of Kunming Metro.